Indian Lake is an unincorporated community and census-designated place (CDP) in Crawford County, Missouri, United States. It is in the northwestern part of the county, surrounding a lake of the same name, a reservoir on Brush Creek, a north-flowing tributary of the Bourbeuse River.

Indian Lake was first listed as a CDP prior to the 2020 census.

Demographics

References 

Census-designated places in Crawford County, Missouri
Census-designated places in Missouri